Zimran, also known as Zambran, was, according to the Hebrew Bible, the first son of the marriage of Abraham, the patriarch of the Israelites, and Keturah, whom he wed after the death of Sarah. Zimran had five other brothers, Jokshan, Medan, Midian, Ishbak, and Shuah.  

Josephus tells us that "Abraham contrived to settle them in colonies; and they took possession of Troglodytis and the country of Arabia Felix, as far as it reaches to the Red Sea." For such reasons Zimran has also been tentatively identified by some with the Arabian town of Zabran, between Mecca and Medina (i.e. Jeddah).

According to the Book of Jasher, the children of Zimran were Abihen, Molich and Narim.

Professor Jan Retso and William Hazlitt (registrar) suggested that the descendants of Zimran are the same people known as "Banizomenes" which were mentioned in the records of the Greek historian Diodorus Siculus.

References

“Genesis 25:2”

External links
Easton's Bible Dictionary: Zimran

Children of Abraham